François Gabriel Théodore Basset de Jolimont (8 February 1787 – 1854) was a French artist, lithographer, painter and antiquary.

Biography

de Jolimont was born at Martainville, not far from Rouen, on 8 February 1787, son of an advocate at the Norman parliament. 
He became interested in drawing at an early age.
When his father died the family fortune was swallowed up by legal fees, and he had to live by his work as an artist. de Joliment acquired considerable talent in painting with gouache and watercolor, and used this skill in reproducing and restoring ancient illustrated manuscripts.
He became a writer on art, water-colorist and paleographer.
He became director of the Gymnase central de Paris.

He had a love of the ancient monuments of France, which he wished to preserve for ever.
He created a great number of illustrations of buildings in Paris, Rouen, Moulins and Dijon, and as both artist and author published a number of illustrated works on the monuments in different cities.
King Louis-Philippe awarded him a gold medal for his 1845 book on the main buildings in Rouen of the year 1525. Despite his talent and the volume of his work, de Jolimont always struggled with poor fortune.  He died in Dijon on 27 October 1854.

Bibliography

Gallery

References

1787 births
1854 deaths
18th-century French painters
French male painters
19th-century French painters
19th-century French male artists
18th-century French male artists